Hans-Josef Büsken is a German lightweight rower. He won a gold medal at the 1976 World Rowing Championships in Villach with the lightweight men's eight.

References

Year of birth missing (living people)
West German male rowers
World Rowing Championships medalists for West Germany
Living people